Igor-Alexandre Nataf (born 2 May 1978) is a French chess player. He received the FIDE title of Grandmaster in 1998.

Chess career
Nataf represented France at the European Team Chess Championship in 1999 and at  Olympiads in 2000 and 2004. In the 2000 FIDE World Championship, he beat Emil Sutovsky and Nigel Short before losing to the Brazilian grandmaster Rafael Leitão in round 3. He was less successful in the 2001–02 World Championship, beating Viktor Bologan in round 1 but losing to Konstantin Sakaev in round 2.

Notable games

Nataf's win against John Nunn at the 1999 French Team championship was voted best game in Chess Informant 76 in 1999.

Sicilian Defence, Kalashnikov Variation (ECO B32) 1.e4 c5 2.Nf3 Nc6 3.d4 cxd4 4.Nxd4 e5 5.Nb5 d6 6.c4 Be7 7.N1c3 a6 8.Na3 f5 9.Bd3 f4 10.g3 Nf6 11.gxf4 exf4 12.Bxf4 0-0 13.Bg3 Ng4 14.Be2 (diagram) Nxf2!! 15.Qd5+ Kh8 16.Bxf2 Nb4 17.Qh5 Rxf2 18.Kxf2 Bh4+ 19.Kg2 g6 20.Qf3 Qg5+ 21.Kf1 Bh3+ 22.Qxh3 Rf8+ 23.Bf3 Qe3 24.Qxh4 Nd3 25.Nd5 Qxf3+ 26.Kg1 Nf2 27.Kf1 Qxh1+ 28.Ke2 Qxa1 0–1

References

External links
 
 
 
 
 

Chess grandmasters
French chess players
Chess Olympiad competitors
Sportspeople from Paris
1978 births
Living people